The Rimrocks (also known as the "Rims") are geological rimrock sandstone formations that outcrop in sections of Billings, Montana.

Eighty million years ago the Billings metro area was the shore of the Western Interior Seaway, a sea that went from the present-day Gulf of Mexico to the Arctic North. Sediment and sand from the sea were deposited around the shoreline. Over time the sea rose and fell leaving behind a deep layer of sand. Over millions of years this sand was compressed into the sandstone the rims are made of. It is known as Eagle Sandstone.

Around a million years ago a much larger river than the current-day Yellowstone River began cutting a canyon into the valley floor of Eagle Sandstone, creating what today is known as the Rimrocks.

The river still continues to cut into the valley floor. This can be witnessed at the base of the Sacrifice Cliff and the Northern Edge of Briarwood Mountain in the South Hills.

The North Rims border north of the Shiloh, West End, Central-Terry, Downtown Core and North Park sections of the city. The  East Rims border the eastern edge of the Downtown core, the South Hills and Briarwood sections of the city. Much of the Heights and Lockwood sit on top of the first rise of the Rimrocks. A second rise borders the eastern edge of Lockwood and also runs several miles north of the city and borders northeast sections of the city. The second rise is over 600 feet in places making the total from the valley floor to the top of the second rise over 1,400 feet in places. The tallest single section of the Rimrocks starts at the eastern border of the downtown area with a cliff known as Sacrifice Cliff and extends to the south for roughly 18 miles. 
This area is known as Coburn Hill.

In the late 1960s, the Concerned Citizens for a Better Billings organized a petition campaign to preserve the Rims in their natural state. When the group's effort's failed, the Billings Gazette published an editorial suggesting that the area be preserved as a national monument. The National Park Service considered the idea, but concluded that the Rimrocks were "of less than national significance."

See also

Sundance Sea

References

Cliffs
Geography of Yellowstone County, Montana
Billings metropolitan area